Zazà  is an opera by Ruggero Leoncavallo, with a libretto by the composer. The story concerns the French music hall singer, Zazà, and her affair and subsequent decision to leave her lover, Milio, when she discovers that he is married. The music is influenced by the French music halls where Leoncavallo had spent his early years as a composer.

Its premiere was at the Teatro Lirico in Milan on 10 November 1900, starring Rosina Storchio as Zazà,  Edoardo Garbin as Milio, Mario Sammarco as Cascart and Clorinda Pini-Corsi as Anaide, and conducted by Arturo Toscanini. It was later seen in opera houses around the world. Over the following twenty years it received over fifty new productions from Palermo to Paris, Buenos Aires to Moscow, Cairo to San Francisco, arriving at the Metropolitan Opera on 16 January 1920 in a production directed by David Belasco and conducted by Roberto Moranzoni, starring Geraldine Farrar, Giulio Crimi and Pasquale Amato, and later, Giovanni Martinelli and Giuseppe De Luca. 

La bohème and Zazà are the operas of Leoncavallo's which most nearly matched the success of Pagliacci, although both enjoy few contemporary productions, and are relatively little-known beyond circles of Opera enthusiasts.

Dayton Daily News editor Betty Dietz Krebs described Zazà as alternating "between moments of passion and intensity and stretches of comedy" and said that it contains "a string of arias."

Reviews of early performances in New York were lukewarm on the music and stated that the best music was similar to that of Pagliacci. Reviewing an early performance at the Metropolitan Opera in 1920, the New York Tribune stated that the music "is not fresh or original, nor even characteristic of its composer except in places where it is reminiscent of Pagliacci, and even in its best moments it is sadly lacking in distinction; but it challenges praise which must go to the creation of a man who knew his business, knew it thoroughly."  Reviewing the Metropolitan premiere The Standard Union stated that the opera "was best when it most recalled [Pagliacci]."  The New York Herald praised Geraldine Farrar's performance in the title role at the Metropolitan premiere but said that the music "neither illuminates nor interferes with the drama.  It is often futile, often a mere blank, but by no means infrequently in excellent accord with the sentiment of the situation. If there are few vocal climaxes, the two or three that exist are theatrically well planned."

Roles

References

Sources

Gelli, Piero (ed.), "Zazà", Dizionario dell'Opera, Baldini Castoldi Dalai, 2007, . Accessed online 8 July 2009.
 Zazà archive at the Teatro Grattacielo. Retrieved, April, 2010. 
 Gallery of photographic postcards from Alterocca-Terni of the first production of Zazà in 1900.

Operas
Operas by Ruggero Leoncavallo
Italian-language operas
1900 operas
Operas set in France